Esteban Sapir (born June 6, 1967, in Buenos Aires) is an Argentine cinematographer, film director, and screenplay writer. In the 1990s he began directing commercials and music videos.

He is of Jewish descent but is not practicing.

Filmography
Directing
 Picado fino (1996) aka Fine Powder
 Shakira: Live and Off the Record (2004) (Video)
 La Antena (2007) aka The Aerial

Cinematography
 Noches áticas (1995)
 Rey muerto (1995)
 Picado fino (1996) aka Fine Powder
 La Vida según Muriel (1997) aka Life According to Muriel
 Prohibido (1997)
 Aluap (1997)
 Cohen vs. Rosi (1998)
 Un Crisantemo Estalla en Cinco Esquinas (1998) aka A Chrysanthemum Bursts in Cincoesquinas
 Río escondido (1999) aka Hidden River
 Buenos Aires plateada (2000)
 El Nadador inmóvil (2000)
 Tesoro mío (2000)
 La T.V. y yo (2002)
 La Antena (2007)

Camera Operator
 Esa maldita costilla (1999) aka The Damned Rib
 Un Crisantemo Estalla en Cinco Esquinas (1998) aka A Chrysanthemum Bursts in Cincoesquinas
 Prohibido (1997)
 Aluap (1997)
 La Ausencia (1995)

References

External links
 
 

1967 births
Argentine cinematographers
Argentine film directors
Argentine screenwriters
Jewish Argentine writers
Male screenwriters
Argentine male writers
Living people
People from Buenos Aires